Wayne Goodman is an American psychiatrist and researcher who specializes in Obsessive-Compulsive Disorder (OCD). He is the principal developer, along with his colleagues, of the Yale-Brown Obsessive Compulsive Scale (Y-BOCS), which is considered to be the gold standard for assessing OCD.

In 2016, Goodman was appointed the D.C and Irene Ellwood Professor and chair of the Menninger Department of Psychiatry and Behavioral Sciences at Baylor College of Medicine. He is also an adjunct professor in the Department of Electrical and Computer Engineering at Rice University.

Biography
Prior to joining Baylor, Goodman was professor and chairman of the Department of Psychiatry at the Icahn School of Medicine at Mount Sinai and The Mount Sinai Behavioral Health System for seven years. During his tenure, the department rose to be among the top ten in the nation in research funding from the National Institutes of Health.

Goodman also served as director of the Division of Adult Translational Research and Treatment Development at the National Institute of Mental Health from 2007 to 2009. He was chairman of the Department of Psychiatry at the University of Florida in Gainesville for nine years.

A native of New York City, Goodman attended the Bronx High School of Science and graduated from Columbia University with a degree in electrical engineering. He received his medical degree from Boston University School of Medicine and completed his internship, residency, and research fellowship at Yale School of Medicine.

Major accomplishments in OCD

Yale-Brown Obsessive Compulsive Scale (Y-BOCS)
In 1985, Goodman founded and served as chief of the OCD Clinic at Yale University. During this time, along with his colleagues Lawrence Price and Steven Rasmussen, he developed the Y-BOCS, which is widely used in research and clinical practice to determine the severity of OCD and to monitor improvement during treatment. It has since been translated into numerous languages.

Goodman and his colleagues have also developed the Yale-Brown Obsessive-Compulsive Scale—Second Edition (Y-BOCS-II) in an effort to modify the original scale. Other rating scales developed by Goodman and his colleagues include: the Children's Yale-Brown Obsessive Compulsive Scale (CY-BOCS), Florida Obsessive Compulsive Inventory (FOCI), the Children's Florida Obsessive Compulsive Inventory (C-FOCI), Level 2—Repetitive Thoughts and Behaviors (Cross-cutting symptom measure used in the DSM-5), and the Treatment-Emergent Activation and Suicidality Assessment Profile (TEASAP).

Selective serotonin reuptake inhibitors
Goodman was one of the first investigators to test and establish the efficacy of Selective Serotonin Reuptake Inhibitors (SSRIs) in OCD and show their comparative advantage over other antidepressant medications. He also developed the use of adjunctive antipsychotic medications in SSRI-resistant OCD and found that patients with comorbid tic disorders are most likely to respond to this combination.

International OCD Foundation
In 1986, Goodman co-founded the nonprofit OCD Foundation (now named the International OCD Foundation). While on faculty at Yale University, he had the idea to bring together a group of dedicated individuals with OCD who were participating in research studies for a self-help group. They later expanded and started a foundation to help reach a wider audience and educate the public about OCD and treatment options. He served as chair of its scientific advisory board for the first ten years. Goodman received the Lifetime Career Achievement Award from the International OCD Foundation in 2012.

Deep brain stimulation
Goodman conducts research in the use of Deep Brain Stimulation (DBS) for treatment-resistant psychiatric disorders. He has published on the use of DBS for intractable OCD. In October 2016, The National Institute of Neurological Disorders and Stroke awarded him a grant for research aimed at developing a new generation of DBS technology. The funding, which was re-issued by the NIH for 2017, is part of President Obama's Brain Research through Advancing Innovative Neurotechnologies (BRAIN) Initiative.

Service with the Food and Drug Administration
Goodman served as chair of the FDA Psychopharmacology Drug Advisory Committee (PDAC) from 2004 to 2008. During that time period, the FDA deliberated and eventually decided to require a Black Box warning on suicidality for all antidepressant drugs. Goodman voted in favor of the Black Box warning for the pediatric population in 2004. Two years later, he voted that the warning be extended up to age 24. He has also served on the FDA Neurological Devices Advisory Committee.

References

Year of birth missing (living people)
Living people
American psychiatrists
Columbia School of Engineering and Applied Science alumni
Boston University School of Medicine alumni
Obsessive–compulsive disorder researchers
Baylor College of Medicine faculty